The testes, at an early period of foetal life, are placed at the back part of the abdominal cavity, behind the peritoneum, and each is attached by a peritoneal fold, the mesorchium, to the mesonephros.

See also
 mesentery
 mesovarium
Mesorchium is the fibrous sheath which attaches vascular and avascular structures of spermatic cord together.

References

External links
  - "Inguinal Region, Scrotum and Testes: Coverings of the Testis"
 

Animal developmental biology